Ragnar Søegaard is chairman of Ruter, the public transport authority for Oslo and Akershus, Norway. Together with Søegaard, the Ruter council consist of 7 council members.

References

Living people
Year of birth missing (living people)
Place of birth missing (living people)